The Red Bull RB13 is a Formula One racing car designed and constructed by Red Bull Racing to compete during the 2017 FIA Formula One World Championship. The car was driven by Daniel Ricciardo and Max Verstappen. It made its competitive debut at the 2017 Australian Grand Prix.

It is the first British-based foreign F1 car to utilize ExxonMobil fuel and lubricants since 2013, along with Toro Rosso STR12 based in Faenza, Italy.

Competition history

The pre-season testing proved that the car was a long way behind the two leaders, i.e. Ferrari and Mercedes in both pace and reliability.

Opening rounds
The  proved that the team was the 3rd quickest behind Ferrari and Mercedes. Verstappen qualified in 5th, almost 1.3 seconds off Lewis Hamilton's pole position time and almost half a second down on Kimi Räikkönen in the Ferrari. Ricciardo meanwhile, crashed during his opening run in Q3 and received a 5-place grid penalty for changing his car's gearbox. In the race, Verstappen held his position and finished in 5th but misery continued for his teammate at his home Grand Prix as Ricciardo's car broke down during the installation laps and was forced to start 2 laps down as his mechanics worked to repair his car. Ricciardo later retired on lap 26 after his engine failed. He rated it as one of his worst race weekends in his whole career.

In China, Ricciardo left his Australian Grand Prix weekend's woes behind him and qualified in 5th behind a similar top 4 as in Australia. Verstappen meanwhile failed to get into Q2 as his car entered into an engine mode which lowered the power and he qualified in 19th. The race was much better for Verstappen as he started from 16th after Romain Grosjean and Jolyon Palmer received penalties for failing to slow down under yellow flags caused by Antonio Giovinazzi who crashed on the final corner during Q1. Giovinazzi himself received a penalty for replacing his car's gearbox. Under the semi-dry conditions, Verstappen made a brilliant start which saw him climb up 7 places by the end of the first lap; Ricciardo meanwhile overtook Räikkönen into the first corner on lap 1. Lance Stroll's crash on lap 1 and Giovinazzi's crash on lap 4 caused the Virtual Safety Car and Safety Car respectively. This allowed Verstappen and Ricciardo to eclipse Ferrari's Sebastian Vettel and Mercedes' Valtteri Bottas in the pits. Verstappen finished in 3rd bringing Red Bull its first podium in 2017 ahead of Ricciardo in 4th.

The  saw Ricciardo outqualify Räikkönen for 4th, who undoubtedly was in a quicker car, and Verstappen qualified in 6th. Ricciardo eventually lost out to Räikkönen's quicker Ferrari and finished behind him in 5th and Verstappen retired on lap 11 due to a brake failure.

European and Canadian rounds
Verstappen and Ricciardo claimed that the upgrades had worked and they could find more speed in the high speed corners. Verstappen qualified in 5th ahead of Ricciardo in 6th. During the race, Verstappen retired on the opening lap after colliding with Ferrari's Räikkönen forcing the latter to retire from the race; Ricciardo meanwhile had an easy drive and finished 3rd behind Hamilton and Vettel, more than a minute behind the latter and was the only other driver to finish on the lead lap.

Verstappen qualified in 4th ahead of Ricciardo in 5th. During the race Verstappen was told to pit before Ricciardo to give him the advantage over his teammate. But Verstappen engaged in a battle with Mercedes' Bottas which resulted both of them losing time to Ricciardo. Ricciardo made his one and only pit stop and managed to overcut both Bottas and Verstappen and came out in 3rd. Ricciardo finished third ahead of Bottas and Verstappen finished in 5th. Verstappen showed his frustration over the team radio after Ricciardo managed to overcut him in the pits.

Verstappen made a brilliant start managing to overtake 3 cars and ended up in 2nd before the first corner. But Verstappen had another frustrating race as he retired from 2nd after suffering from a battery failure. Ricciardo managed to defend from the two Force India cars for the whole race and finished in 3rd for the third time in three races.

Ricciardo meanwhile, crashed on his first run in Q3 which forced him to start from 10th. On an occasion which saw a lot of collisions, 3 safety cars and a red flag, Ricciardo took an unlikely win even after falling down to 17th after making a precautionary pit-stop to remove debris from his car's radiator. His win was also made possible after all the cars which qualified ahead of him except Williams's Lance Stroll, had an incident or a penalty issued. He won the race three seconds ahead of Mercedes' Valtteri Bottas who also made a comeback drive after falling a lap behind the leaders because of an opening lap crash; Verstappen's bad luck continued after he retired from the race after only 12 laps due to an engine failure.

Complete Formula One results
(key) (results in bold indicate pole position; results in italics indicate fastest lap)

Notes
† – Driver failed to finish the race, but was classified as they had completed greater than 90% of the race distance.

References

Red Bull Formula One cars
2017 Formula One season cars